Makerere University Teaching Hospital, (MUTH), is a planned hospital, to be constructed in Katalemwa, Wakiso District, in the northern suburbs of Kampala, Uganda's capital and largest city.

Location

Overview
As of December 2019, Makerere University, Uganda′s oldest and largest public university, was in advanced stages of plannings to build a private teaching hospital in the northern suburbs of Kampala, the capital city of that East African country.

The development will include the hospital, student housing, staff housing, a day-care centre and green recreational spaces. The budgeted cost for the construction of the hospital is US$400 million. Construction is expected to start in 2020.

Medical school affiliation
Makerere University Teaching Hospital is affiliated with Makerere University School of Medicine. It is expected to host interns, while they practice medicine under supervision for one year, before they attain an unrestricted licence to practice medicine.

See also
Hospitals in Uganda

References

External links
  University Teaching Hospital at Katalemwa

Hospitals in Uganda
Wakiso District
Makerere University
Teaching hospitals in Uganda